Diversion is a 1980 British film written and directed by James Dearden. It was later adapted into the 1987 thriller film Fatal Attraction, where Dearden wrote the screenplay.

Plot
A happily married man has an affair with another woman when his wife is away but the other woman wants more than just a one-night stand.

Cast
Stephen Moore as Guy
Cherie Lunghi as Erica
Morag Hood as Annie
Ned Vukovic as Waiter
Dickon Horsey as Charlie
Alice as Dog

References

External links
 

1980s mystery films
1980s psychological thriller films
1980 films
Adultery in films
Erotic romance films
British erotic thriller films
Films directed by James Dearden
Films about sexuality
Films about stalking
1980 directorial debut films
1980s English-language films
1980s British films